Kjetil Løvvik (born 16 October 1972) is a retired Norwegian footballer.

He played for Skjold IL, SK Nord and FK Haugesund in his early career, before being sold to SK Brann in 1996. He was loaned out to Vålerenga for a period before making a breakthrough in Brann, and was sold in July 1999 to Grasshopper Club Zürich. His seldom played first-team football there, and was loaned out to FK Lyn. In the seasons 2000, 2001 and 2002 he played 65 league games and scored 13 goals.

Around late 2002/early 2003, Løvvik invested  together with football agent Terje Simonsen to form a new club in Stord, called Stord/Moster FK. In February 2003 Løvvik decided to cease his professional career to play for Stord/Moster in addition to owning the club. He lived in Oslo, but flew to Stord to play matches and became a prolific goalscorer. In 2004, he played less, and he retired after the season. By late 2005 his (and Simonsen's) involvement in Stord/Moster was over.

References

1972 births
Living people
Norwegian footballers
FK Haugesund players
SK Brann players
Vålerenga Fotball players
Eliteserien players
Grasshopper Club Zürich players
Swiss Super League players
Norwegian expatriate footballers
Expatriate footballers in Switzerland
Norwegian expatriate sportspeople in Switzerland
Lyn Fotball players
People from Haugesund
Association football forwards
Sportspeople from Rogaland